The Aeronca C-2 is an American light monoplane designed by Jean A. Roche and built by Aeronca Aircraft.

Development

Roche Monoplane
Jean A. Roche was a U.S. Army engineer at McCook Field airfield in Dayton, Ohio. Roche developed an aircraft with automatic stability and was granted U. S. Patent No. 1,085,461.  Roche published his engineering ideas for the aircraft in Aerial Age Weekly and Slipstream Monthly magazines. The prototype was started in Ohio in 1923 with the assistance of fellow engineer Quinten Dohse. The aircraft used a triangular cross-section welded steel tube fuselage, with wood wings, was fabric-covered, and used wire bracing throughout. A Henderson engine was installed, but did not perform well. Next a custom 29 hp two-cylinder Morehouse engine was developed for the aircraft. On September 1, 1925, the aircraft was successfully test flown. Many pilots including Jimmy Doolittle tried out the aircraft. Wright Aeronautical hired Morehouse and rights to his Wright-Morehouse WM-80 engine. Left without an engine, They turned to Robert E. Galloway of the Aeronautical Corporation of America to use the Aeronca E-107 engine. The rights to the aircraft were sold to Aeronca in 1928 as the basis for the C-2 Design.

Aeronca C-2
The Aeronca C-2, powered by a tiny two-cylinder engine, made its first flight in October 1929, with its public debut in St. Louis in February 1930.  It was flying at its most basic—the pilot sat on a bare plywood board.  The C-2 featured an unusual, almost frivolous design with an open-pod fuselage that inspired its nickname, The Flying Bathtub. (It was also nicknamed "Airknocker" and "Razorback".) The general design of the C-2 could have been inspired by Jean Roche's initial flight experiences with an American-built copy of the Santos-Dumont Demoiselle, which had a similar  triangular "basic" fuselage cross-section, and wire-spoked main landing gear wheels against the fuselage sides.

Equipped with only four instruments (altimeter, oil temperature, oil pressure, and tachometer), a stick, and rudder pedals (brakes and a heater at extra cost), the C-2 was priced at a low $1,555 (later US$1,245), bringing the cost of flying down to a level that a private citizen could perhaps reach. Aeronca sold 164 of the economical C-2s at the height of the Great Depression in 1930-1931, helping to spark the growth of private aviation in the United States.

The Aeronca C-2 also holds the distinction of being the first aircraft to be refueled from a moving automobile. A can of gasoline was handed up from a speeding Austin automobile to a C-2 pilot, (who hooked it with a wooden cane) during a 1930 air show in California. A seaplane version of the C-2 was also offered, designated the PC-2 and PC-3 ("P" for pontoon) with floats replacing the wheeled landing gear.

A single Aeronca C-2 was converted to a glider by H.J. Parham in England after an inflight engine failure and forced landing. The nose was faired in after the removal of the engine.  It first flew as a glider 15 May 1937 and went to the Dorset Glider Club but was destroyed in the club hangar during a storm in November 1938.

Variants

Aeronca C-2 Single-seat light sporting aircraft, powered by a 26-hp (19-kW) Aeronca E-107A piston engine.
Aeronca C-2 Deluxe Improved version, with a wider fuselage and a number of design improvements.

Aeronca C-2N Scout Deluxe sporting aircraft, powered by a 36-hp (27-kW) Aeronca E-112 or E-133A piston engine. Four built.
Aeronca PC-2 Seaplane version of the C-2.
Aeronca PC-2 Deluxe Seaplane version of the C-2 Deluxe.

Surviving aircraft

Canada
 A-9 – C-2 on static display at the Canada Aviation and Space Museum in Ottawa, Ontario.

United States
 2 – C-2 on static display at the Udvar-Hazy Center of the National Air and Space Museum in Chantilly, Virginia. It is the first prototype of the Aeronca C-2 and bears the registration NX626N. It was donated to the museum in 1948 by Aeronca and was restored in 1976.
 27 – C-2 airworthy at the Yanks Air Museum in Chino, California.
 67 – C-2 on static display at the Ohio History Center in Columbus, Ohio.
 A-106 – C-2N airworthy owned by Craig MacVeigh of Seattle, Washington.
 A-151 – C-2N is on display at the Shannon Air Museum in Fredericksburg, Virginia.
 A-253 – C-2N on static display at the EAA AirVenture Museum in Oshkosh, Wisconsin. This particular aircraft set seven records, five of which were for seaplanes.
 301-23 – C-2 on static display at the Museum of Flight in Seattle, Washington.

Specifications (C-2)

See also

References

External links

The Smithsonian's preserved Aeronca C-2, the first one produced

1920s United States civil utility aircraft
Aeronca aircraft
High-wing aircraft
Single-engined tractor aircraft
Aircraft first flown in 1929